Zvyozdny is an abandoned settlement on Wrangel Island, in Chukotka Autonomous Okrug, Russia. It was abandoned in the 1970s.

Geography 
Zvyozdny is located on the southern shore of Wrangel Island, west of Ushakovskoye. It is approximately 702 km from Anadyr, and approximately 5,634 km from Moscow.

History

Early History 
The earliest evidence of human habitation in area the dates back to between 2,850 and 3,360 years ago, in the form of knives, harpoons, and other tools from the Paleo-Inuit culture. These ancient inhabitants hunted marine mammals to survive.

Modern History 
Wrangel Island was first discovered by Thomas Long, an American whaler. It was claimed by the Russian Empire in 1916, and then by the U.S.S.R. in 1924. The settlement was founded by the Soviet government in the 1960s, but then abolished in the 1970s. The only remaining inhabited area is the Zvyozdny airbase, which was constructed by the Soviets at Cape Hawaii. The base is equipped with S-300 air defence systems, Pantsir-S1 anti-aircraft systems, and Rubezh anti-ship coastal systems, as well as radar and electronic warfare capabilities. Training has been held there in recent years.

Climate 
The climate of Zvyozdny is arctic, or ET under the Köppen climate classification.

References 

Rural localities in Chukotka Autonomous Okrug
Russian Far East